The culture of Rome in Italy refers to the arts, high culture, language, religion, politics, libraries, cuisine, architecture and fashion in Rome, Italy. Rome was supposedly founded in 753 BC and ever since has been the capital of the Roman Empire, one of the main centres of Christianity, the home of the Roman Catholic Church and the seat of the Italian Republic. Due to its historical and social importance, Rome has been nicknamed the Caput Mundi, or "capital of the world".

The arts

Architecture and city layout

Ancient Rome

One of the symbols of Rome is the Colosseum (70-80 AD), the largest amphitheatre ever built in the Roman Empire. Originally capable of seating 60,000 spectators, it was used for gladiatorial combat. The list of the very important monuments of ancient Rome includes the Roman Forum, the Domus Aurea, the Pantheon, Trajan's Column, Trajan's Market, the several catacombs area, the Circus Maximus, the Baths of Caracalla, Castel Sant'Angelo, the Mausoleum of Augustus, the Ara Pacis, the Arch of Constantine, the Pyramid of Cestius, and the Bocca della Verità.

Medieval

Often overlooked, Rome's medieval heritage is one of the largest in Italian cities. Basilicas dating from the Paleochristian age include Santa Maria Maggiore and San Paolo Fuori le Mura (the second largely rebuilt in the 19th century), both housing precious 4th century AD mosaics. Later notable medieval mosaic and fresco art can be also found in the churches of Santa Maria in Trastevere, Santi Quattro Coronati and Santa Prassede. Lay buildings include a number of towers, the largest being the Torre delle Milizie and the Torre dei Conti, both next the Roman Forum, and the huge staircase leading to the basilica of Santa Maria in Ara Coeli.

Renaissance and Baroque

Rome was a major world center of the Renaissance, second only to Florence, and was profoundly affected by the movement. The most impressive masterpiece of Renaissance architecture in Rome is the Piazza del Campidoglio by Michelangelo, along with the Palazzo Senatorio, seat of the city government. During this period, the great aristocratic families of Rome used to build opulent dwellings as the Palazzo del Quirinale (now seat of the President of the Republic), the Palazzo Venezia, the Palazzo Farnese, the Palazzo Barberini, the Palazzo Chigi (now seat of the Prime Minister), the Palazzo Spada, the Palazzo della Cancelleria, and the Villa Farnesina.

Rome is also famous for her huge and majestic squares (often adorned with obelisks), many of which were built in the 17th century. The principal squares are Piazza Navona, Piazza di Spagna, Campo de' Fiori, Piazza Venezia, Piazza Farnese and Piazza della Minerva. One of the most emblematic examples of the baroque art is the Fontana di Trevi by Nicola Salvi. Other notable baroque palaces of the 17th century are the Palazzo Madama, now seat of the Italian Senate and the Palazzo Montecitorio, now seat of the Chamber of Deputies of Italy.

Neoclassicism

In 1870, Rome became capital city of the new Kingdom of Italy. During this time, neoclassicism, a building style influenced by the architecture of Antiquity, became a predominant influence in Roman architecture. In this period many great palaces in neoclassical styles were built to host ministries, embassies and other governing agencies. One of the best-known symbol of Roman neoclassicism is the Monument of Vittorio Emanuele II or "Altar of Fatherland", where the grave of the Unknown Soldier, that represents the 650,000 Italians that fell in World War I, is located.

Fascist architecture

The Fascist regime that ruled in Italy between 1922 and 1943 developed an architectural style which was characterized by its linkages with ancient Rome architecture. The most important fascist site in Rome is the E.U.R. district, built in 1935. It was originally conceived for the 1942 world exhibition, and was called "E.42" ("Esposizione 42"). However, the world exhibition never took place because Italy entered the Second World War in 1940. The most representative building of the Fascist style at E.U.R. is the Palazzo della Civiltà Italiana (1938–1943), the iconic design of which has been labelled the cubic or Square Colosseum.
After World War II, the Roman authorities found that they already had the seed of an off-centre business district that other capitals were still planning (London Docklands and La Defense in Paris). Also the Palazzo della Farnesina, the actual seat of Italian Foreign Ministry, was designed in 1935 in fascist style.

Vatican City

The city of Rome surrounds the Vatican City, the enclave of the Holy See, which is a separate sovereign state. It hosts Saint Peter's Square with the Saint Peter's Basilica. The open space before the basilica was redesigned by Gian Lorenzo Bernini, from 1656 to 1667, under the direction of Pope Alexander VII, as a forecourt, designed "so that the greatest number of people could see the Pope give his blessing, either from the middle of the façade of the church or from a window in the Vatican Palace" (Norwich 1975 p 175). In Vatican City there are also the Vatican Library, Vatican Museums with the Sistine Chapel, the Raphael Rooms and other important works of Leonardo da Vinci, Raphael, Giotto, and Botticelli. Vatican City is an independent country situated inside Rome.

Museums and galleries
The most important museums and galleries of Rome include the Vatican Museums, National Museum of Rome, the Museum of Roman Civilization, the Villa Giulia National Etruscan Museum, the Capitoline Museums, the Borghese Gallery, the Museum of Castel Sant'Angelo, and the National Gallery of Modern Art.

Villas and gardens

The center of Rome is surrounded by some large green areas and opulent ancient villas, which are the remains of the crowns of villas which encircled the papal city. Most of them were largely destroyed by real estate speculation at the end of the 19th century. The most important among the surviving ones are:
 Villa Borghese, with a large landscape garden in the naturalistic 19th century English style, containing a number of buildings, museums (see Galleria Borghese) and attractions;
 Villa Ada, the largest public landscaped park of Rome;
 Villa Doria Pamphili, the second largest with an area of 1.8 km2;
 Villa Torlonia, a splendid example of Art Nouveau mansion that was the Roman residence of Benito Mussolini;
 Villa Albani, commissioned by Cardinal Alessandro Albani to house his collection of antiquities and Roman sculpture, which soon filled the casino that faced the Villa down a series of formal parterres.

Art
Rome contains a vast and impressive collection of art, sculpture, fountains, mosaics, frescos, and paintings, from all different periods. Rome first became a major artistic centre during ancient Rome, with forms of important Roman art such as architecture, painting, sculpture and mosaic work. Metal-work, coin-die and gem engraving, ivory carvings, figurine glass, pottery, and book illustrations are 'minor' forms of Roman artwork. Rome later became a major centre of Renaissance art, since the popes spent vast sums of money for the constructions of grandiose basilicas, palaces, piazzas and public buildings in general. Rome became one of Europe's major centres of Renaissance artwork, second only to Florence, and able to compare to other major cities and cultural centres, such as Paris and Venice. The city was affected greatly by the baroque, and Rome became the home of numerous artists and architects, such as Bernini, Caravaggio, Carracci, Borromini and Cortona, to name a few. In the late-18th century and early-19th century, the city was one of the centres of the Grand Tour, when wealthy, young English and other European aristocrats visited the city to learn about ancient Roman culture, art, philosophy and architecture. Rome hosted a great number of neoclassical and rococo artists, such as Pannini and Bernardo Bellotto. Today, the city is a major artistic centre, with numerous art institutes and museums.

Cinema

Rome hosts the Cinecittà Studios, the largest film and television production facility in continental Europe and the centre of the Italian cinema, where a large number of today's biggest box office hits are filmed. The 99-acre (40-ha) studio complex is 5.6 miles (9 km) from the centre of Rome and is part of one of the biggest production communities in the world, second only to Hollywood, with well over 5,000 professionals—from period costume makers to visual effects specialists. More than 3,000 productions have been made on its lot, from recent features like The Passion of the Christ, Gangs of New York, Adult Swim, The Life Aquatic and Dino De Laurentiis’ Decameron, to such cinema classics as Ben-Hur, Cleopatra, and the films of Federico Fellini.

Founded in 1937 by Benito Mussolini, the studios were bombed by the Western Allies during the Second World War. In the 1950s, Cinecittà was the filming location for several large American film productions, and subsequently became the studio most closely associated with Federico Fellini. Today Cinecittà is the only studio in the world with pre-production, production, and full post-production facilities on one lot, allowing directors and producers to walk in with their script and "walk out" with a completed film.

Fashion

Rome is one of the world's fashion capitals. Major luxury fashion houses and jewellery chains, including Bulgari, Fendi, Laura Biagiotti and Brioni, are headquartered in the city, or were founded there, and other major labels, including Gucci, Chanel, Prada, Dolce & Gabbana, Armani and Versace have luxury boutiques in Rome, primarily on Via dei Condotti.

Religion

Much like the rest of Italy, Rome is predominantly Roman Catholic. Although Rome is home to the Vatican City and St. Peter's Basilica, Rome's cathedral is the Basilica of St. John Lateran, located to the south-east of the city-centre. There are around 900 churches in Rome in total, aside from the cathedral itself, some others of note include: the Basilica di Santa Maria Maggiore, the Basilica of Saint Paul Outside the Walls, the Basilica di San Clemente, San Carlo alle Quattro Fontane and the Church of the Gesu. There are also the ancient Catacombs of Rome underneath the city. Numerous highly important religious educational institutions are also in Rome, such as the Pontifical Lateran University, Pontifical Biblical Institute, Pontifical Gregorian University, and Pontifical Oriental Institute. 

The territory of Vatican City is part of the Mons Vaticanus, and of the adjacent former Vatican Fields, where St. Peter's Basilica, the Apostolic Palace, the Sistine Chapel, and museums were built, along with various other buildings. The area was part of the Roman rione of Borgo until 1929. Being separated from the city, on the west bank of the Tiber river, the area was an outcrop of the city that was protected by being included within the walls of Leo IV, and later expanded by the current fortification walls of Paul III/Pius IV/Urban VIII. When the Lateran Treaty of 1929 that gave the state its present form was being prepared, the boundaries of the proposed territory was influenced by the fact that much of it was all but enclosed by this loop. For some tracts of the frontier, there was no wall, but the line of certain buildings supplied part of the boundary, and for a small part of the frontier a modern wall was constructed.

The territory includes Saint Peter's Square, distinguished from the territory of Italy only by a white line along the limit of the square, where it touches Piazza Pio XII. St. Peter's Square is reached through the Via della Conciliazione, which runs from the Tiber River to St. Peter's. This grand approach was constructed by Benito Mussolini after the conclusion of the Lateran Treaty. According to the Lateran Treaty, certain properties of the Holy See that are located in Italian territory, most notably Castel Gandolfo and the major basilicas, enjoy extraterritorial status similar to that of foreign embassies.

In recent years, the Islamic community has grown significantly, in great part due to immigration from North African and Middle Eastern countries into the city. As a consequence of this trend, the comune promoted the building of the largest mosque in Europe, which was designed by architect Paolo Portoghesi and inaugurated on June 21, 1995.

Language
The original language of Rome was Latin, which evolved during the Middle Ages into Italian. The latter emerged as the confluence of various regional dialects, among which the Tuscan dialect predominated, but the population of Rome also developed its own dialect, the Romanesco. The ancient romanesco, used during the Middle Ages, was a southern Italian dialect, very close to the Neapolitan. The influence of the Florentine culture during the renaissance, and, above all, the immigration to Rome of many Florentines who were among the two Medici Popes' (Leo X and Clement VII) suite, caused a strong change of the dialect, which resembled more the Tuscan varieties (the immigration of Florentines was mainly due to the Sack of Rome in 1527 and the subsequent demographic decrease). This remained largely confined to Rome until the 19th century, but then expanded other zones of Lazio (Civitavecchia, Latina), from the beginning of the 20th century, thanks to the rising population of Rome and to better transportation systems. As a consequence, Romanesco abandoned its traditional forms to mutate into the dialect spoken within the city, which is more similar to standard Italian, although remaining distinct from other Romanesco-influenced local dialects of Lazio. Dialectal literature in the traditional form Romanesco includes the works of such authors as Giuseppe Gioacchino Belli, Trilussa, and Cesare Pascarella. Contemporary Romanesco is mainly represented by popular actors such as Aldo Fabrizi, Alberto Sordi, Nino Manfredi, Anna Magnani, Gigi Proietti, Enrico Montesano, and Carlo Verdone.

Entertainment and performing arts

Rome is an important centre for music, and it has an intense musical scene, including several prestigious music conservatories and theatres. It hosts the Accademia Nazionale di Santa Cecilia (founded in 1585), for which new concert halls have been built in the new Parco della Musica, one of the largest musical venues in the world. Rome also has an opera house, the Teatro dell'Opera di Roma, as well as several minor musical institutions. The city also played host to the Eurovision Song Contest in 1991 and the MTV Europe Music Awards in 2004.

Rome has also had a major impact in music history. The Roman School was a group of composers of predominantly church music, which were active in the city during the 16th and 17th centuries, therefore spanning the late Renaissance and early Baroque eras. The term also refers to the music they produced. Many of the composers had a direct connection to the Vatican and the papal chapel, though they worked at several churches; stylistically they are often contrasted with the Venetian School of composers, a concurrent movement which was much more progressive. By far the most famous composer of the Roman School is Giovanni Pierluigi da Palestrina, whose name has been associated for four hundred years with smooth, clear, polyphonic perfection. However, there were other composers working in Rome, and in a variety of styles and forms.

Tourism

Rome today is one of the most important tourist destinations of the world, due to the incalculable immensity of its archaeological and artistic treasures, as well as for the charm of its unique traditions, the beauty of its panoramic views, and the majesty of its magnificent "villas" (parks). Among the most significant resources are the many museums – (Musei Capitolini, the Vatican Museums, Galleria Borghese, including those dedicated to modern and contemporary art and great many others) – aqueducts, fountains, churches, palaces, historical buildings, the monuments and ruins of the Roman Forum, and the Catacombs. Rome is the 3rd most visited city in the EU, after London and Paris, and receives an average of 7–10 million tourists a year, which sometimes doubles on holy years. The Colosseum (4 million tourists) and the Vatican Museums (4.2 million tourists) are the 39th and 37th (respectively) most visited places in the world, according to a 2009 study.

Rome is a major archaeological hub, and one of the world's main centres of archaeological research. There are numerous cultural and research institutes located in the city, such as the American Academy in Rome, and The Swedish Institute at Rome, to name a few. Rome contains numerous ancient sites, including the Forum Romanum, Trajan's Market, Trajan's Forum, the Colosseum, and the Pantheon, to name but a few. The Colosseum, arguably one of Rome's most iconic archaeological sites, is regarded as a wonder of the world.

Rome has a growing stock of contemporary and modern art and architecture. The National Gallery of Modern Art has works by Balla, Morandi, Pirandello, Carrà, De Chirico, De Pisis, Guttuso, Fontana, Burri, Mastroianni, Turcato, Kandisky, Cézanne on permanent exhibition. 2010 sees the opening of Rome's newest arts foundation, a contemporary art and architecture gallery designed by acclaimed Iraqi architect Zaha Hadid. Known as MAXXI – National Museum of the 21st Century Arts it restores a dilapidated area with striking modern architecture. Maxxi features a campus dedicated to culture, experimental research laboratories, international exchange and study and research. It is one of Rome's most ambitious modern architecture projects alongside Renzo Piano's Auditorium Parco della Musica and Massimiliano Fuksas' Rome Convention Center, Centro Congressi Italia EUR, in the EUR district, due to open in 2011. The Convention Centre features a huge translucent container inside which is suspended a steel and teflon structure resembling a cloud and which contains meeting rooms and an auditorium with two piazzas open to the neighbourhood on either side.

Cuisine

Rome's cuisine has evolved through centuries and periods of social, cultural, and political changes. Rome became a major gastronomical centre during Ancient Rome. Ancient Roman Cuisine was highly influenced by Ancient Greek culture, and after, the empire's enormous expansion exposed Romans to many new, provincial culinary habits and cooking techniques. In the beginning, the differences between social classes were not very great, but disparities developed with the empire's growth. Later, during the Renaissance, Rome became well known as a centre of high-cuisine, since some of the best chefs of the time, worked for the popes. An example of this could be Bartolomeo Scappi, who was a chef, working for Pius IV in the Vatican kitchen, and he acquired fame in 1570 when his cookbook Opera dell'arte del cucinare was published. In the book he lists approximately 1000 recipes of the Renaissance cuisine and describes cooking techniques and tools, giving the first known picture of a fork. Today, the city is home to numerous formidable and traditional Italian dishes. A Jewish influence can be seen, as Jews have lived in Rome since the 1st century BCE. Vegetables, especially globe artichokes, are common. Examples of these include "Saltimbocca alla Romana" – a veal cutlet, Roman-style; topped with raw ham and sage and simmered with white wine and butter; "Carciofi alla giudia" – artichokes fried in olive oil, typical of Roman Jewish cooking; "Carciofi alla romana" – artichokes Roman-style; outer leaves removed, stuffed with mint, garlic, breadcrumbs and braised; "Spaghetti alla carbonara" – spaghetti with bacon, eggs and pecorino, and "Gnocchi di semolino alla romana" – semolina dumpling, Roman-style, to name but a few.

Sports

Football (soccer) is the most popular sport in Rome, as in the rest of the country. The city hosted the final games of the 1934 and 1990 FIFA World Cup. The latter took place in the Olympic Stadium, which is also the home stadium for local Serie A clubs A.S. Roma and S.S. Lazio, whose rivalry has become a staple of Roman sports culture. Footballers who play for these teams and are also born in the city tend to become especially popular, as has been the case with players such as Francesco Totti and Daniele De Rossi (both for A.S. Roma). Atletico Roma is a minor team that plays in First Division; its home stadium is Stadio Flaminio.

Rome hosted the 1960 Summer Olympics using ancient sites such as the Villa Borghese and the Thermae of Caracalla as venues. For the Olympic Games new structures were created, notably the new large Olympic Stadium (which was also enlarged and renewed to host qualification and the final match of the 1990 FIFA World Cup), the Villaggio Olimpico (Olympic Village, created to host the athletes and redeveloped after the games as a residential district), etc. Rome bid for the 2020 Summer Olympics.

Rugby union is gaining wider acceptance. The Stadio Flaminio is the home stadium for the Italy national rugby union team, which has been playing in the Six Nations Championship since 2000. They have never won the championship. Rome is home to local rugby teams, such as Unione Rugby Capitolina, Rugby Roma, and S.S. Lazio.

Every May, Rome hosts the ATP Masters Series tennis tournament on the clay courts of the Foro Italico. Cycling has been popular in the post-World War II period. Rome has hosted the final portion of the Giro d'Italia twice, in 1989 and 2000. Rome is home to sports teams, including basketball (Virtus Roma), volleyball (M. Roma Volley), handball and waterpolo.

Pilgrimage
Rome has been a major Christian pilgrimage site since the Middle Ages. People from all over the Christian world visit Vatican City, within the city of Rome, the seat of the papacy. The Pope was the most influential figure during the Middle Ages. The city became a major pilgrimage site during the Middle Ages and the focus of struggles between the Papacy and the Holy Roman Empire starting with Charlemagne, who was crowned its first emperor in Rome in 800 by Pope Leo III. Catholics believe that the Vatican is the last resting place of St. Peter. to this day, thousand of believers flock to the city to Rome. One of the pilgrimage stopping point is pilate's stairs where, according to the Christian tradition, the steps that led up to the praetorium of Pontius Pilate in Jerusalem, which Jesus Christ stood on during his Passion on his way to trial. The stairs were, reputedly, brought to Rome by St. Helena in the 4th Century. For centuries, the Scala Santa has attracted Christian pilgrims who wished to honour the Passion of Jesus.

Education

Universities
The city's first university, La Sapienza, was founded in 1303. Two further large public universities were founded in the late 20th century: Tor Vergata in 1982, and Roma Tre in 1992; today each has around 38,000 students. Also state-supported is IUSM, a vocational university with 2000 students located in the Foro Italico district and dedicated exclusively to sports and movement sciences.

A large number of pontifical universities and institutes are located in Rome, including the Pontifical Gregorian University, founded in 1551 and the oldest Jesuit university in the world, and the Pontifical University of St. Thomas Aquinas (the ‘Angelicum’) which represents the ongoing Dominican scholastic tradition established by St. Dominic and St. Thomas Aquinas.

The city is also home to a number of private universities. The Libera Università Maria SS. Assunta (LUMSA) is a Catholic institution founded in 1939. LUISS, founded in 1966, has faculties of Economics, Law and Political Science. The Università Campus Bio-Medico is a small Catholic university which focusses on medicine, nursing and biomedical engineering. The Libera Università degli Studi San Pio V, founded in 1966, has faculties of Economics, Foreign Languages and Literature, and Political Sciences. There are also Roman centres of the Milanese Università Cattolica del Sacro Cuore and of the Istituto Europeo di Design, a design school founded in Milan in 1966 which now has a presence in eight cities and two continents.

Foreign universities based in Rome include The American University of Rome and the John Cabot University: private American liberal arts institutions founded in 1969 and 1972 respectively The Link Campus is an international university initially constituted as the Italian branch of the University of Malta. Also present are St. John's University, a branch of St. John's University in New York City and the John Felice Rome Center, of Loyola University Chicago.

References

Italian culture
Culture in Rome